Robert Wallace (born 14 February 1948 in Huddersfield) is a former footballer who made 322 appearances in the Football League as a midfielder, playing for Huddersfield Town, Halifax Town, Chester and Aldershot.

References

External links
Halifax Town Team Photo 1971

1948 births
Living people
Footballers from Huddersfield
Association football midfielders
English Football League players
Huddersfield Town A.F.C. players
Halifax Town A.F.C. players
Chester City F.C. players
Aldershot F.C. players
English footballers